Heliotropium tenellum, the pasture heliotrope, is a species of plant in the heliotrope family. It is native to southeastern and south-central North America, where it is found in limestone glades and rocky prairies.

It is an annual species that produces white flowers in the summer.

References

tenellum